Percy Verwayne (March 10, 1895 – November, 1968), sometimes spelled Percy Verwayen,
was an American stage and film actor. He featured in several films with African American casts including the 1921 REOL Productions film The Simp and Oscar Micheaux films. He played  "Sporting Life" in Porgy, when it was first produced in 1927. He was also in the 1946 Toddy Pictures production Fight That Ghost. 

He was born in British Guyana.

Theatre

Porgy (1927)
Confidence (1930), by and starring Frank Wilson

Filmography

The Simp (1921)
A Daughter of the Congo (1930) as Pidgy Muffy
Paradise in Harlem (1939) as Spanish
Fight that Ghost (1946)
Sepia Cinderella (1947) as MacMillan

References

External links

 

1895 births
1968 deaths
Guyanese emigrants to the United States

Federal Theatre Project people